Forsaken is a 1998 first-person shooter video game. It was developed by Probe Entertainment for Microsoft Windows and PlayStation and Iguana Entertainment UK for the Nintendo 64 and published by Acclaim Entertainment. A remastered version was released in 2018 for Microsoft Windows, macOS, Linux and Xbox One.

Gameplay 
Forsaken is a 3D first-person shooter in the style of Descent (1995), featuring similar weapons, power-ups, having missiles and mines being labeled "secondary weapons", and involving 3D movement of a vehicle through several tunnels. It is set on a futuristic Earth that, in 2113, had all of its life destroyed as a result of a shockwave from a science accident. The goal of the game differs between formats. In the PC and PlayStation versions, the player acts as someone trying to obtain the planet's lost treasure, while in the Nintendo 64 release, the goal is to kill looters finding the treasure. There are also elements of Quake.

The single-player mode has four difficulty modes: easy, normal, hard and total mayhem. Each has progressively stronger enemies and less ammo to spare. Due to the near-impossible challenge presented by the four modes, Acclaim provided the patch 1.00 that (among other things) decreased the difficulty of the game dramatically. There are 22 missions, each requiring the player to either destroy all enemy ships in a maze of tunnels, or achieve a certain target, such as completing within a time limit and/or at a specific percentage of enemies murdered. Similar to Starfox 64 (1997), different paths appear depending on which targets were achieved.

There are six different types of multiplayer games: Free for All (deathmatch), Team Game, Capture the Flag, Flag Chase, Bounty Hunt, and Team Bounty Hunt. There are various sub-options for each. Up to 16 players can join in on the PC version, four on the Nintendo 64, and two for the PlayStation. Also on the Nintendo 64 version, a maximum of three computer players can join. The PC version also has the ability to record demos.

Plot 
In the distant future, the advancement of science has exceeded humanity's ability to control it. During a subatomic experiment, an accident causes an uncontrollable fusion reaction, utterly destroying the surface of the planet Earth.

One year later, Earth has been classified as "condemned" by the ruling imperial theocracy, meaning that it is now legal for anyone to salvage anything left on the planet. Mercenaries from all over come to raid the dead planet, forced to battle not only each other, but the robot sentinels that the government has left behind.

Development 
The game was developed by Probe Entertainment during the 1996–1998 period as the company became merged into its parent company (Acclaim). At that time, Microsoft's newly bought and re-branded rendering layer (DirectX) had just started to dominate PC development.

Fergus McGovern headed the development team. The game was heavily technology driven at the beginning and was titled ProjectX. This was changed to Condemned when the story elements were added although it was later changed to Forsaken due to a potential naming conflict.

A Sega Saturn version of the game was announced, but canceled as part of Acclaim's general withdrawal of support for the system.

Due to the heavy technology focus of the game, it was often bundled with hardware to show off the graphic cards, and was used as a benchmark for many years after its initial release.

The Swarm (Dominic Glynn and Stephen Root) performed and produced the Forsaken soundtrack which features dynamic drum and bass and electronica tracks. An album featuring many of the original tracks and remixes was released on No Bones Records.

Various employees of Acclaim Studios Teesside, the developer who worked on the Nintendo 64 port of the game, made plans for a sequel to Forsaken, which were permanently scrapped when Acclaim closed the studio down in 2002.

Reception

Paul Biondich of AllGame argued that although its gameplay was uninventive, its PC version, with its 3D Accelerator chip and Direct3D, has "utterly impressive technical savvy and attention to detail" few other games had achieved. He highlighted "the quality and generous use of real-time colored lighting effects", "the screen blistering frame rates", explosions, the detail of enemy ships, and smoke trails of missiles. He also was immersed in the visuals: "Many times during the course of playing this game you may find yourself head bobbing, trying to peer over a wall or ducking from enemy fire. It's really quite an amazing effect." He praised the diversity and amount of surprise in the gameplay, attributed to the level scenery, traps, and huge amount of weapons and powerups. 

Edge stated that, although the PlayStation version feels familiar to Descent, it refined and updated the formula with features such as its auto-levelling system and orientation aid. Hyper gave the game 92% and said: "Unless someone pulls some wonder game out of the bag at E3, this one looks like it's going to be the all-formats game of the year.  If you like action shooter games, this is a must-have". 

Martin Kitts of N64 Magazine compared Forsaken to Quake and Descent (1995), as well as 2D shooters such as R-Type (1987) and Axelay (1992). He called it the best "serious" Nintendo 64 title since GoldenEye, and "a game that, although not for the fainthearted, holds a genuinely rewarding experience for those who are prepared to persevere". He wrote that the game's best moments were those that required thinking, although did enjoy the more intense parts, such as enemies popping up behind the player and shots from guns hidden in alcoves. Despite the use of static, non-animated character models, he called the visuals impressive nonetheless, particularly the lighting effects as the best on the Nintendo 64, "giving heated battles a pleasant lava lamp effect, with shots and explosions bouncing around the room in slow motion." He enjoyed how enemy ships, when destroyed, spin out of control, fire random shots, and occasionally dive on the player, adding to the fast-paced gameplay. He also higlighted there being no fogging in the four-playing mode.

It did take a little bit of time for him to appreciate the game, however; he was critical of the default control system, as well as the first stage that "will leave most players cold, soon turning into a tedious slog around a nondescript 360° maze". He also was disappointed in the multiplayer mode, writing it was hard to tell players from each other and that weapons barely took off hit points of other players, resulting in overly-long matches.

Bobba Fatt of GamePro disliked Forsaken, describing it as an "endless maze of frustration" wasting "excellent control and four-player split-screen capability". He criticized the lack of radar, which made it difficult to look for the other players in multi-player, and made single-player a chore: "You'll run in perpetual circles looking for your objective or final enemy until you either memorize the level or pass out. Even worse, the unimaginative bad guys blend right into the background, and every level looks just like the previous one."

Hypers Dan Toose called the PC version one of the best-looking 3D accelerator titles. He wrote the PlayStation version was the smoothest in frame-rate, but also only allowed for two players and was the hardest to control with the D-pad. He called the Nintendo 64 version the most "impressive" for its diverse missions, particularly how they felt as intense as real-life situations.

Next Generation reviewed the Nintendo 64 version of the game, rating it three stars out of five, and stated that "overall, this is solid, enjoyable stuff with not a hint of originality to cloud the fun".

Next Generation reviewed the PlayStation version of the game, rating it three stars out of five, and wrote that "all in all, this is a decent title. Probe has mixed together the best elements of Descent and Quake and added some pretty tricky enemy AI, resulting in a game that shines, although in slightly different ways, on each platform".

Next Generation reviewed the PC version of the game, rating it three stars out of five, and stated that "Forsaken is a good game that will provide a nice distraction until players get their hands on the big guns like Sin, Half-Life, and Duke Nukem Forever".

References

External links
 Official website for remastered version
 

1998 video games
Acclaim Entertainment games
Cancelled Sega Saturn games
Commercial video games with freely available source code
Dystopian video games
First-person shooters
Linux games
MacOS games
Multiplayer and single-player video games
Nintendo 64 games
PlayStation (console) games
Video games developed in the United Kingdom
Video games with 6 degrees of freedom
Windows games
Xbox One games
Zero-G shooters